The 1994 Paris–Tours was the 88th edition of the Paris–Tours cycle race and was held on 2 October 1994. The race started in Saint-Arnoult-en-Yvelines and finished in Tours. The race was won by Erik Zabel of the Telekom team.

General classification

References

1994 in French sport
1994
Paris-Tours
1994 in road cycling
October 1994 sports events in Europe